The Dornier Do K was a German commercial passenger and freight monoplane, designed by Claude Dornier and built by Dornier Flugzeugwerke. Only three prototypes of different designs were built and the type was not a commercial success.

Design and development

Do K1
The first Dornier Do K was the K1 which first flew on 7 May 1929. The K1 was a conventionally-braced high-wing monoplane, powered by a single nose-mounted  licence-built Bristol Jupiter VI radial engine, and had a conventional landing gear with a tailskid. The square-section fuselage had an enclosed cockpit for two with a cabin behind for freight or eight passengers. Test flights showed that performance was poor and the aircraft was redesigned.

Do K2
The Do K2 flew in December 1929 with similar wings and fuselage but had a changed landing gear and four  Gnome-Rhone Titan radial engines. The four engines were strut mounted on each side of the fuselage in tandem pairs, one in tractor configuration and the other as a pusher. Although the aircraft had an increase in available power, the performance was little improved on the K1.

Do K3 
The K3 was a complete rethink of the design. The braced wing was replaced with a cantilever wing of larger span. The fuselage was changed to oval and stretched for two extra passengers and the tailskid was replaced with a tailwheel and the main units were enclosed in fairings. The four engines were in the same tandem arrangement as the K2, but located lower on the fuselage and changed to  Walter Castor radial engines. The performance was greatly improved but still provoked little interest and no others were built.

Specifications (Do K3)

References
Notes

Bibliography

External links

 "Do-K Shows Speed In Test Flights", May 1932, Popular Mechanics

Do K
1920s German airliners
Four-engined push-pull aircraft
High-wing aircraft
Aircraft first flown in 1929